Benjamin Agnel (born 29 November 1973) is a French former ice hockey player. He competed in the 1994 Winter Olympics.

References

External links

1973 births
Living people
Brûleurs de Loups players
Dragons de Rouen players
French ice hockey centres
Ice hockey players at the 1994 Winter Olympics
LHC Les Lions players
Olympic ice hockey players of France
Sportspeople from Ouagadougou
21st-century Burkinabé people